The list of King Albert II and Queen Paola of Belgium's state visits is:

State visits abroad by King Albert II and Queen Paola in Belgium

1990s

2000s

2010s

State visits received by King Albert II and Queen Paola in Belgium

1990s

2000s

See also 
 List of honours of the Belgian Royal Family by country
 :Template:Belgian Royal Family

Sources
 Royal family's website, State visits in Belgium (French)
 Royal family's website, State visits abroad (French)
 Royal family's website, Audiences (French)

References

Foreign relations of Belgium
Albert 02
Albert 02
Albert 02
Albert 02
Albert II